Jorge Zarif Neto (11 September 1957 – 12 March 2008 in São Paulo, Brazil) was a Brazilian Olympic sailor. He competed in the Finn class in the 1984 Summer Olympics (finishing eighth) and in the 1988 Summer Olympics (finishing 19th). He was the father of Brazilian Olympic sailor Jorge Zarif.

References

1957 births
2008 deaths
Sportspeople from São Paulo
Brazilian male sailors (sport)
Olympic sailors of Brazil
Finn class sailors
Star class sailors
Sailors at the 1984 Summer Olympics – Finn
Sailors at the 1988 Summer Olympics – Finn
Brazilian people of Arab descent